The Hanover Town Library, also known as the Etna Library, is a historic branch library located at 130 Etna Road in Hanover, New Hampshire, United States. It serves the Etna section of the town; the Classical Revival building it occupies was the first purpose-built library building in the town, and is listed on the National Register of Historic Places. It is a modest brick building, designed by Dartmouth College professor Robert E. Fletcher and built in 1905.

Description and history
The Etna Library is located in the village of Etna in eastern Hanover, on the north side of Etna Road near King Road.  It is a modest single-story masonry structure, built of red brick with granite trim and covered by a hip roof.  Its main facade is three bays wide, with paired narrow sash windows on either side of the center entrance.  Each sash window is topped by a transom window, and the paired windows have rough-cut stone lintels and sills.  The entrance is sheltered by a projecting portico, which has round Tuscan columns supporting a corniced entablature.  The entrance is a single door, set in a large segmented-arch opening with flanking double-width sidelight windows.  The building has a rear projection that was designed to house a vault for the town documents.

Hanover's first lending library, a private endeavour, was established in 1801, and it and later similar organizations were based in the centrally located Etna village through the 19th century.  In 1898, the town voted to establish a public library, which was seeded with these earlier collections.  In March 1905, the town appropriated funds for the construction of a building, and this one was completed later that year.  It was designed by Robert E. Fletcher, a Dartmouth College professor of engineering.  The building has been little altered since its construction, principally to add a lavatory in the former vault space.

See also
National Register of Historic Places listings in Grafton County, New Hampshire

References

External links
The Howe Library (main library) web site
Town of Hanover - Etna Library

Libraries on the National Register of Historic Places in New Hampshire
Colonial Revival architecture in New Hampshire
Library buildings completed in 1905
Libraries in Grafton County, New Hampshire
National Register of Historic Places in Grafton County, New Hampshire
Buildings and structures in Hanover, New Hampshire
1905 establishments in New Hampshire